Stefan or Stevan Marković may refer to:

Stefan Marković (politician) (1804–1864), Serbian politician
Stefan Marković (basketball) (born 1988), Serbian basketball player
Stefan Marković (footballer) (born 1993), Serbian football player
Stevan Marković (bodyguard) (1937–1968), murdered Serbian bodyguard of movie star Alain Delon
Stevan Marković (footballer) (born 1988), Montenegrin football player

See also